Carl Rousseau Gilliard (born April 18, 1958) is an American actor, director, and producer.

Career

Gilliard started his career working as a radio newscaster at WGPR in Detroit. He moved to Los Angeles in 1985, where he appeared in over 2 dozen plays. He has also appeared in films such as Inception, The Lost Shepherd, and Retiring Tatiana. Gilliard currently resides in Palmdale, California.

Filmography

Film

Television

External links
Carl Gillard at IMDb
Carl Gilliard Personal Website

1958 births
Living people
20th-century American male actors
American directors
Film producers from Illinois
American radio news anchors
People from Chicago
African-American male actors
American male film actors
American male stage actors
Male actors from Chicago
Journalists from Illinois